Jordan Village Historic District may refer to:

Jordan Village Historic District (Waterford, Connecticut), listed on the NRHP in Connecticut
Jordan Village Historic District (Jordan, New York), listed on the NRHP in Onondaga County, New York

See also
Jordan Historic District, Jordan, Minnesota, listed on the NRHP in Minnesota